Ascot Park is a suburb of Porirua City approximately  north of Wellington in New Zealand.

Ascot Park covers an area of 1.12 km², including a land area of 1.12 km². It includes the suburb's namesake, the Ascot Park public reserve.

Demography

Ascot Park had a population of 2,862 at the 2018 New Zealand census, an increase of 237 people (9.0%) since the 2013 census, and an increase of 201 people (7.6%) since the 2006 census. There were 804 households. There were 1,389 males and 1,470 females, giving a sex ratio of 0.94 males per female. The median age was 31.8 years (compared with 37.4 years nationally), with 720 people (25.2%) aged under 15 years, 639 (22.3%) aged 15 to 29, 1,230 (43.0%) aged 30 to 64, and 270 (9.4%) aged 65 or older.

Ethnicities were 45.1% European/Pākehā, 29.4% Māori, 42.6% Pacific peoples, 12.1% Asian, and 2.5% other ethnicities (totals add to more than 100% since people could identify with multiple ethnicities).

The proportion of people born overseas was 22.5%, compared with 27.1% nationally.

Although some people objected to giving their religion, 35.5% had no religion, 49.0% were Christian, 1.5% were Hindu, 1.4% were Muslim, 2.1% were Buddhist and 3.1% had other religions.

Of those at least 15 years old, 309 (14.4%) people had a bachelor or higher degree, and 468 (21.8%) people had no formal qualifications. The median income was $30,500, compared with $31,800 nationally. The employment status of those at least 15 was that 1,110 (51.8%) people were employed full-time, 240 (11.2%) were part-time, and 132 (6.2%) were unemployed.

Economy

In 2018, 10.7% worked in construction, 10.2% worked in healthcare, 8.9% of the workforce worked in manufacturing, 7.6% worked in education, 5.1% worked in hospitality, and 5.1% worked in transport.

Transportation

As of 2018, among those who commuted to work, 70.4% drove a car, 8.2% rode in a car, and no one walked, ran, cycled or used public transport.

Education

Ascot Park Kindergarten is also located in Ascot Park.

References

External links 
Ascot Park Community Profile at  Statistics NZ

Suburbs of Porirua